Hiroki Matsueda (松枝博輝, born 20 May 1993) is a Japanese long-distance runner. He is expected to compete in the 5000 metres at the 2020 Summer Olympics. He also won the 5000 m at the 2017 and 2019 Japanese Championships and won the bronze medal in the same event at the 2019 Asian Athletics Championships.

References

Japanese male long-distance runners
Athletes (track and field) at the 2020 Summer Olympics
1993 births
Living people
Olympic athletes of Japan